Karen Ann Stockin is a New Zealand academic marine ecologist, and as of 2021 is a full professor at Massey University. Her research focuses on animal welfare and the impacts of human activities on cetacean populations, including tourism effects, and persistent marine contaminants.

Academic career 

Stockin obtained a Bachelors of Science (Honours) from the University of Plymouth, and a Masters of Science as a European Union Scholar from the University of Aberdeen. She completed her PhD as a Commonwealth Scholar at Massey University in 2008, with a thesis titled "The New Zealand common dolphin (Delphinus sp.): identity, ecology and conservation", supervised by Mark Orams.

Stockin is the strandings coordinator for the International Whaling Commission, and serves on the IWC Strandings Initiative Expert Panel.

Recognition 
In 2005, Stockin was awarded a Hutton Award by the Royal Society Te Apārangi.

In 2018, Stockin received a Rutherford Discovery Fellowship for a project title "The application of artificial intelligence (AI), innovative technologies and evolutionary theory to address the conservation-welfare nexus during human-wildlife interactions". She was also made the inaugural Bob Kerridge Animal Welfare Fellow in the same year.

Selected works

References

External links 

 
 

Living people
New Zealand women academics
Year of birth missing (living people)
Alumni of the University of Plymouth
Alumni of the University of Aberdeen
Massey University alumni
Academic staff of the Massey University
New Zealand marine biologists
New Zealand women scientists